Air Twister is a rail shooter video game developed and published by YS Net and released on June 24, 2022 for iOS and macOS via Apple Arcade.

Development

In 2008, Yu Suzuki created his video game incubation studio YS Net. The studio has produced a few small scale mobile games and the kickstarter funded console game Shenmue III. Air Twister was the studio's first big budget internationally released smart phone game.

A 3-D Space Harrier concept for smart phones was first shared by Suzuki with Polygon in a 2015 interview. However, he is reluctant to call Air Twister a spiritual successor to Space Harrier. 

For Air Twister, Suzuki took inspiration from numerous sources: vintage floppy disc games Mystery House, the Ultima series, to other Sega rail shooters namely Panzer Dragoon and  Tetsuya Mizuguchi's Rez. 

Suzuki, a long time fan of Dutch musician Valensia, reached out to him via Facebook to compose the music, to which he agreed.

Upon release there were many game modes that were labeled as coming soon, in the end of August 2022 all game modes were available with the release of Version 1.1. The new modes included two new bonus stages in the stardust mode as well as a Turbo mode and an unlockable island in the adventure mode.

Release
The game was released June 24, 2022 exclusively on Apple Arcade.

References

External links
'' Interview with YS Net
Air Twister Apple Arcade Page
Official Website

Video games developed in Japan
Video games designed by Yu Suzuki
Apple Arcade games
Single-player video games